Thoburnia is a genus of suckers found in the eastern United States.  There are currently three recognized species in this genus.

Species
 Thoburnia atripinnis (R. M. Bailey, 1959) (Blackfin sucker)
 Thoburnia hamiltoni Raney & Lachner, 1946 (Rustyside sucker)
 Thoburnia rhothoeca (Thoburn, 1896) (Torrent sucker)

References
 

 
Fish of North America
Fish of the United States
Taxa named by David Starr Jordan